Gerard Cott (born 30 April 1940) is a former Irish Fine Gael politician and secondary teacher. He was elected to Dáil Éireann for the Cork North-East constituency at the 1969 general election. He did not contest the 1973 general election.

References

1940 births
Living people
Fine Gael TDs
Members of the 19th Dáil
Politicians from County Cork
Irish schoolteachers